Ladislav Čierny (born November 3, 1974) is a Slovak former professional ice hockey defenceman.

Čierny played in the Slovak Extraliga for HKm Zvolen and HC Slovan Bratislava. He also played in the Czech Extraliga for Motor České Budějovice and the Russian Superleague for HC Lada Togliatti and Severstal Cherepovets.

Career statistics

External links

1974 births
HC Lada Togliatti players
HC Slovan Bratislava players
HKM Zvolen players
Living people
Motor České Budějovice players
Severstal Cherepovets players
Slovak ice hockey defencemen
Sportspeople from Zvolen
Slovak expatriate ice hockey players in the Czech Republic
Slovak expatriate ice hockey players in Russia